The Flaming Sword is a lost 1915 silent film drama directed by Edwin Middleton and starring  Lionel Barrymore  and Jane Grey. It was produced and distributed by Metro Pictures.

Cast
Lionel Barrymore - Steve
Jane Grey - Meera Calhoun
Edith Diestel - ? (*as Miss Diestel)
Mrs. Middleton - ? (*as Mrs. E. Middleton)
Glen White - ? (*as Glenn White)

References

External links

1915 films
American silent feature films
Lost American films
American black-and-white films
Silent American drama films
1915 drama films
Films directed by Edwin Middleton
Metro Pictures films
1915 lost films
Lost drama films
1910s American films
1910s English-language films